New Year's Eve is a lost 1929 film drama produced and distributed by Fox Film Corporation and starring Mary Astor
and Charles Morton. Veteran Henry Lehrman, who had worked with Mack Sennett and Charlie Chaplin, was the director. Samuel L. Rothafel wrote the music for film. The Western Electric Sound System was used but a silent version was also made. Max Gold was an assistant director.

This was not a talking film despite it being made in 1929. It was a silent with music and effects soundtrack.

Plot

Saddled with the care of a younger brother and unable to find work, Marjorie Ware puts aside her scruples and goes to see a gambler who has long cast a lustful eye on her. A pickpocket kills the gambler, and the police find Marjorie at the scene of the crime, charging her with the murder. The pickpocket later falls to his death, however, and evidence is uncovered that sets Mary free, cleared of all suspicion of guilt in the gambler's death. Mary is then reunited with Edward Warren, a man who once did her a great kindness.

Cast

 Mary Astor – Marjorie Ware
 Charles Morton – Edward Warren
 Earle Fox – Barry Harmon
 Florence Lake – Pearl
 Arthur Stone – Steve
 Helen Ware – Landlady
 Freddie Burke Frederick – Little Brother
 Jane La Verne – Little Girl
 Sumner Getchell – Edward's friend
 Stuart Erwin – Landlady's son
 Virginia Vance – Little Girl's Mother

References

External links

allrovi listing

1929 films
1929 drama films
Fox Film films
Silent American drama films
American silent feature films
American black-and-white films
Films based on short fiction
Films directed by Henry Lehrman
Lost American films
Films set around New Year
1929 lost films
Lost drama films
1920s American films